Valvata aliena is a species of minute freshwater snail with an operculum, an aquatic gastropod mollusk in the family Valvatidae, the valve snails.

Distribution
This species lives in Siberia.

References

External links 
 Valvata aliena at AnimalBase

Valvatidae
Gastropods described in 1877